This is a list of public holidays in Kazakhstan:

Public holidays

Other holidays
 National Guard Day - January 10
 Day of the State Security Service of Kazakhstan - April 21
 Police Day - June 23
 Border Guards Day - August 18
 Day of Remembrance of the Victims of Political Repressions - October 30

References

 
Kazakhstan
Events in Kazakhstan
Kazakhstani culture